"Natural High" is a song written by Freddy Powers, and recorded by American country music artist Merle Haggard backed by The Strangers.  It was released in March 1985 as the third single from the album It's All in the Game.  The song was Haggard's thirty-third number one single on the country chart as a solo artist.  The single featuring harmony vocals by Janie Fricke went to number one for one week and spent a total of  twelve weeks on the country chart.

Personnel
Merle Haggard– vocals, guitar, fiddle

The Strangers:
Roy Nichols - lead guitar
Norm Hamlet – steel guitar
Tiny Moore – fiddle, mandolin
Mark Yeary – keyboards
Dennis Hromek - bass
Biff Adams - drums
Jim Belken – fiddle
Don Markham – horns

Charts

Weekly charts

Year-end charts

References

1985 singles
Merle Haggard songs
Song recordings produced by Ray Baker (music producer)
Epic Records singles
Songs written by Freddy Powers
1984 songs